Yuyan (1918–1997), courtesy name Yanrui, nickname Xiaoruizi, was a Chinese calligrapher of Manchu descent. He was a member of the Aisin Gioro clan, the imperial clan of the Qing dynasty. He claimed that he was appointed by Puyi, the last Emperor of China, as the heir to the throne. His claim is the subject of the travel adventure book The Empty Throne by British journalist Tony Scotland.

Early life
Born in Wangfujing, Beijing, Yuyan was the second son of Pucheng (溥偁) and Jinggui (敬貴), a lady of the Fuca (富察) clan. His grandfather was Zailian (載濂; 1854–1917), a son of Yicong (1831–1889), the fifth son of the Daoguang Emperor. He was a distant cousin of Puyi, the Last Emperor.

In 1936, Yuyan was summoned by Puyi, who had been enthroned as the ruler of the puppet state Manchukuo in 1934 by the Empire of Japan, to join his imperial court in Changchun, Jilin. Yuyan was very close to Puyi, who called him "Xiaoruizi" (小瑞子; or "Little Rui").

Life in the People's Republic of China
After the fall of Manchukuo, Yuyan was arrested by the Soviets and imprisoned from 1945 to 1950 near Khabarovsk in the Soviet Union's Far East Region along with Puyi. He was later sent back to China, where he was incarcerated in the Fushun War Criminals Management Centre in Liaoning from 1950 to 1957.

Yuyan was a pretender to the Chinese throne. He claimed that Puyi appointed him as heir when they were both imprisoned in the Soviet Union in 1950. In his autobiography, Puyi wrote only that he considered selecting Yuyan as his heir. Under a succession law adopted in 1937, Puyi's younger brother, Pujie, became next in line in succession to the throne.

Following his release from Fushun, Yuyan worked as a Chinese language teacher, and later in a haberdashery factory. He was arrested in 1959 and sent for hard labour at a public security detention centre near Beijing. Yuyan was arrested again in 1966 during the Cultural Revolution and sent to do hard labour in Shanxi. He was only released in 1979 and allowed to return to Beijing, where he became a road sweeper.

After release from prison
Yuyan was a calligrapher and poet. In 1987, he was appointed as a state consultant on the restoration of the Prince Gong Mansion in Beijing.

Yuyan is the main character in the book The Empty Throne: The Quest for an Imperial Heir in the People's Republic of China (1993) by the British journalist Tony Scotland. Scotland was searching for an heir to the imperial throne of China.

Family
 Elder sister: Yujuying (毓菊英), married Chen Yingsan (陳英三), son of Chen Zengshou (陳曾壽).
 Spouses: 
 Magiya Jinglan (馬佳靜蘭), of Manchu descent, married Yuyan in 1943.
 Zhang Yunfang (張雲訪), married Yuyan after Magiya Jinglan died in 1948 in Tianjin.
 Children:
 Hengzhen (恆鎮; b. 1944), eldest son, born to Magiya Jinglan, married Tu Yanling (塗艷玲).
 Hengkai (恆鎧; b. 1945), second son, born to Magiya Jinglan, married Liu Xiujuan (劉秀娟).
 Hengjun (恆鈞; b. 1966), third son, born to Zhang Yunfang, married Fan Qin (范秦; b. 1971).
 Grandchildren:
 Hengxing (恆星; b. 1977), name also spelled as Hengxing (恆鍟), Hengzhen and Tu Yanling's son.
 Jin Yinghui (金英輝; b. 1980), also named Qiqi (啟琪), Hengkai and Liu Xiujuan's son.
 Jin Qitong (金啟桐; b. 29 October 1996), Hengjun and Fan Qin's daughter.

Ancestry

See also
 Royal and noble ranks of the Qing dynasty
 Ranks of imperial consorts in China#Qing

References

Succession

1918 births
1997 deaths
Chinese collaborators with Imperial Japan
Qing dynasty imperial princes
Manchu people
Aisin Gioro
Pretenders to the Chinese throne
People of Manchukuo
People of the Republic of China